"Mala Gente" (English: Evil People) is a song by Colombian singer-songwriter Juanes. The song is the third radio single from his second studio album, Un Día Normal. It shows his frustration with his soon-to-be ex-girlfriend who he calls "mala gente" ("evil people" or "evil woman"). She tells him that their romance is now over, and she wants to be friends. He believes her to be a liar, that she cannot be trusted, has played with his emotions and does not want to be friends. That she will come to regret this breakup. His prediction comes true.

This track won the Latin Grammy Award for Best Rock Song at the Latin Grammy Awards of 2003, the third year in a row for him to win in this field.

Track listing
"Mala Gente" - 3:16 (Juan Esteban Aristizábal)

Chart performance

References

2003 singles
Juanes songs
Songs written by Juanes
Spanish-language songs
Universal Music Latino singles
Latin Grammy Award for Best Rock Song
Song recordings produced by Gustavo Santaolalla